The Renault Samsung SM5 is a mid-size car or large family car (D-segment in Europe) produced by the South Korean manufacturer Renault Samsung Motors, with technical assistance from Japanese automaker Nissan. Between 1998 and 2012, Renault Samsung Motors had produced 680,000 SM5 models. In 2018, 10,002 models were made at the Busan plant.

The first generation was launched in 1998, with the second generation introduced in 2005 and the current third generation SM5 launched in 2009. In some markets, the SM5 is sold as the Renault Latitude or Renault Safrane.



First generation (KPQ/A32; 1998–2005)

The first generation model was based on the Nissan Maxima (A32).

Second generation (EX1/DF(A34R); 2005–2010)

The second generation model replaced the previous model in 2005. It is based on its sibling, the SM7. The model was seen in Australia being tested on its roads. The model is also based on the Nissan Teana/Maxima.

In 2008–2010, the car was also sold in the Gulf States and Mexico, as the Renault Safrane. The project code for the SM5 Impression is DF, while that of the Renault Safrane is A34R.

On July 1, 2003, Renault Samsung celebrated the production of the 300,000th SM5 to be manufactured in South Korea.

Third generation (L43; 2009–2019)

On January 18, 2010, the third generation model was released and began to be sold along with the previous model.

Based on the Renault Laguna and designed in Seoul, the New SM5 is manufactured at the firm’s Busan plant in South Korea. The SM5 was planned to be introduced in the U.S. and Canadian markets in 2014, under the Mitsubishi brand, but this plan has since been canceled.

It is available with a two-litre four-cylinder petrol engine, 2.5 litre six-cylinder petrol engine. The SM5 uses a Nissan Xtronic CVT transmission (V6 uses 6 Speed Automatic transmission).

In 2017, RSM recalled several SM5s built between October 1, 2013, and October 31, 2014 due to problems with the coolant temperature sensors.

The SM5 forms the basis to the Renault Latitude sold in the Asia-Pacific region. The new SM5 is once again sold in the Gulf States and Mexico as the Renault Safrane.

The SM6 is expected to be the SM5's successor since RSM did not announce a continuation of the model. Renault Samsung has ended production of the SM5 in 2019.

SM5 Platinum

In November 2012, a facelifted SM5 was launched, called the SM5 Platinum. The facelift included a new design to the front, revised dashboard features and retains the existing Nissan engines.

SM5 NOVA

In January 2015, another facelifted SM5 was launched, called SM5 NOVA. The second facelift included a new Renault-style grille to the front and DRL.

References

External links

SM5
Mid-size cars
Sedans
Front-wheel-drive vehicles
2000s cars
2010s cars
Cars introduced in 1998